Artificial eye may refer to:
 Visual prosthesis, functioning implant designed to restore sight
 Ocular prosthesis, non-functioning cosmetic replacement for a lost eye
 Curzon Artificial Eye, DVD distributor in the UK, specialising in foreign-language films